The 2nd Canadian Comedy Awards, presented by the Canadian Comedy Foundation for Excellence (CCFE), honoured the best live, television, and film comedy of 2000 and was held in April 2001 at The Guvernment in Toronto, Ontario. The ceremony was hosted by Sheila McCarthy and Patrick McKenna and was televised by The Comedy Network.

Canadian Comedy Awards, also known as Beavers, were awarded in 19 categories. Winners were picked by members of ACTRA (Alliance of Canadian Cinema, Television and Radio Artists), the Writers Guild of Canada, the Directors Guild of Canada, and the Comedy Association.

The TV series This Hour Has 22 Minutes led with six nominations followed by Made in Canada with five, and the films Best in Show, New Waterford Girl and Waydowntown with four apiece.  The big winners were Best in Show and This Hour Has 22 Minutes which each received three Beavers, followed by The Second City Mainstage which won for best sketch troupe and best improv troupe.

Ceremony

The 2nd Canadian Comedy Awards ceremony was held in April 2001 at The Guvernment in Toronto, Ontario. The ceremony was hosted by Sheila McCarthy and Patrick McKenna.

The awards ceremony was televised by The Comedy Network. The Star! entertainment channel on Rogers cable carried Before the Laughter: The Canadian Comedy Awards Pre-Show.

The 2001 Canadian Comedy Awards show was nominated for a Gemini Award for best writing in a comedy or variety program.

Winners and nominees
Winners are listed first and highlighted in boldface:

Live

Television

Film

Special Awards

Multiple wins
The following people, shows, films, etc. received multiple awards

Multiple nominations
The following people, shows, films, etc. received multiple nominations.

References

External links
Canadian Comedy Awards official website

Canadian Comedy Awards
Canadian Comedy Awards
Awards
Awards
2000 awards in Canada